The 2016 BFD Energy Challenger was a professional tennis tournament played on clay courts. It was the second edition of the tournament which was part of the 2016 ATP Challenger Tour. It took place in Rome, Italy between 26 September and 2 October 2016.

Singles main-draw entrants

Seeds

 1 Rankings are as of September 19, 2016.

Other entrants
The following players received wild cards into the singles main draw:
  Stefano Napolitano
  Gianluigi Quinzi
  Andrea Pellegrino
  Stefano Pontoglio

The following players received entry from the qualifying draw:
  Gibril Diarra
  Maxime Janvier
  Gianluca Mager
  Mikael Ymer

Champions

Singles

  Jan Šátral def.  Robin Haase, 6–3, 6–2

Doubles

   Federico Gaio /  Stefano Napolitano def.  Marin Draganja /  Tomislav Draganja, 6–7(2–7), 6–2, [10–3]

2016 ATP Challenger Tour
BFD Energy Challenger
BFD Energy Challenger
BFD Energy Challenger